Ty Andrew Taubenheim (born November 17, 1982) is a former pitcher in Major League Baseball. He is 6'6", ., and throws and bats right-handed. Taubenheim features a  sinking fastball, a slider, and a changeup.

Playing career
Taubenheim was drafted in the 19th round of the 2003 Major League Baseball Draft by the Milwaukee Brewers.

He was acquired by the Toronto Blue Jays from the Brewers along with Lyle Overbay for Dave Bush, Zach Jackson, and Gabe Gross on December 7, 2005.

He earned his first win in a relief appearance against the Atlanta Braves on June 22, 2006, pitching just 0.2 innings and allowing one hit, but no runs.

He was claimed off waivers by the Pittsburgh Pirates from the Blue Jays after the  season.

Taubenheim was released by the Pirates on September 2, to make room on the 40-man roster for infielder Luis Cruz, but was re-signed to a minor league contract in January .

On March 31, 2010, Taubenheim signed a minor league contract with the Philadelphia Phillies.

On July 25, 2010, the Reading Phillies of the Eastern League announced Taubenheim had been assigned from Lehigh Valley of the International League.

Taubenheim signed a major league contract with the Texas Rangers in January 2011, but was released before the season began.

References

External links

Minor League Splits and Situational Stats

1982 births
Living people
American expatriate baseball players in Canada
Baseball players from Washington (state)
Beloit Snappers players
Brevard County Manatees players
Edmonds Tritons baseball players
Indianapolis Indians players
Helena Brewers players
Huntsville Stars players
Major League Baseball pitchers
Pittsburgh Pirates players
Sportspeople from Bellingham, Washington
Syracuse Chiefs players
Syracuse SkyChiefs players
Toronto Blue Jays players